Trump protest or Trump protests may refer to:

 Protests against Donald Trump
 Attempts to overturn the 2020 United States presidential election
 2020–2021 United States election protests